But It Isn't Serious (Italian: Ma non è una cosa seria) is a 1921 Italian silent film directed by Augusto Camerini and starring Carmen Boni.

Cast
 Carmen Boni 
 Romano Calò as Memmo Speranza  
 Ignazio Lupi as Il cap. Barranco  
 Fernanda Negri Pouget as Gasperina 
 Giovanni Schettini

See also
But It's Nothing Serious (1936)

References

Bibliography
 Stewart, John. Italian film: a who's who. McFarland, 1994.

External links

1921 films
1920s Italian-language films
Films based on works by Luigi Pirandello
Films directed by Augusto Camerini
Italian silent feature films
Italian films based on plays
Italian black-and-white films